This is a list of the shortest serving Members of the Senedd (MSs) (formerly known as Members of the National Assembly for Wales or simply Assembly Members (AMs) until May 2020).

It includes every former member who served less than the original four-year full term.

Footnotes:

See also
 List of by-elections to the Senedd
 List of United Kingdom MPs with the shortest service
 Regional Member changes to the Senedd

References

Service
Welsh AMs